Carterocephalus argyrostigma  is a species of butterfly found in the East Palearctic (South Siberia, Mongolia, Northeast China) that belongs to the skippers family.

Description
The wing upperside ground colour is dark-brown with yellow spots; the hind wing underside usually has five brilliant silvery-white spots of complicated shapes.

Description from Seitz

Forewing beneath with a light spot which covers the extreme base of cellule 2, and with another placed towards the centre of the same cellule. Hindwing with a light spot in the centre of cellule 8. The upperside of the wings with yellow or yellowish spot. Altai, Mongolia, Amur. According to Graeser in June.

See also
List of butterflies of Russia

References

Heteropterinae
Butterflies described in 1851